Crataegus senta is a putative species of hawthorn native to North Carolina. Most authorities have it as a synonym of Crataegus flava, the summer haw or yellow-fruited thorn, from which it differs by having red fruit.

References

senta
Trees of the Southeastern United States
Plants described in 1900